Ya Ya Yippee is the eighth studio album by the Belgian girlgroup K3. The album was released on 4 September 2006 through label Studio 100, and is a mix of pop and country music. Two singles were released from the album: "Ya Ya Yippee" and "Dokter Dokter". The album reached the peak position in both the Dutch and Flemish album charts.

Track listing

Chart performance

Weekly charts

Year-end charts

Certifications

References

2006 albums
K3 (band) albums